Capability-based operating system generally refers to an operating system that uses capability-based security.

Examples include:
Hydra
KeyKOS
EROS
CapROS
Midori
seL4
Genode
Fuchsia
Control Program Facility

Capability systems
Operating system security